Baraeus subvittatus is a species of beetle in the family Cerambycidae. It was described by Stephan von Breuning in 1955. It is known from Cameroon.

References

Endemic fauna of Cameroon
Pteropliini
Beetles described in 1955